The 2022–23 season is the 121st season in the existence of Norwich City Football Club and the club's first season back in the Championship since the 2020–21 season, following their relegation from the Premier League the previous season. In addition to the league, they will also compete in the season's editions of the FA Cup and EFL Cup.

Transfers

In

Out

Loans in

Loans out

Pre-season and friendlies
The Canaries announced they would travel to Scotland for back-to-back pre-season friendlies against Celtic and Hibernian. On 30 May, Norwich City confirmed further matches for their pre-season schedule, which includes a training camp in Bavaria. Two more matches were added to the calendar against Jahn Regensburg and Olympique de Marseille.

Competitions

Overall record

Championship

League table

Results summary

Results by round

Matches

On 23 June, the league fixtures were announced.

FA Cup

The Canaries were drawn at home to Blackburn Rovers in the third round.

EFL Cup

Norwich City were drawn at home to Birmingham City in the first round and to AFC Bournemouth in the second round.

Squad statistics

Appearances
As of 18 March 2023
Italics indicate a loaned player

|-
|colspan="16"|Out on loan:

|-
|colspan="16"|No longer at the club:

|}

Goalscorers
As of 15 March 2023

See also
 2022–23 in English football
 List of Norwich City F.C. seasons

References 

Norwich City F.C. seasons
Norwich City
English football clubs 2022–23 season